Phred may refer to:

Phred (software), a computer program used in molecular biology
Phred quality score, a term used in molecular biology
Phred (Doonesbury), a character from the comic strip Doonesbury
Phred on Your Head Show, a children's television show
The URL with Phred Show, a spin-off of the above

See also
Fred (disambiguation)